Philipp Wurzbacher (full name Johann Philipp Wurzbacher,  26 May 1898 – 31 March 1984) was a German Sturmabteilung (SA) official and NSDAP member of the Reichstag from March 1933 until 1945.

Marriage and descendants
Würzbacher was married and had two children. He lived in Nürnberg and Schwarzenbruck.

References

E. Kienast (Hg.): Der Großdeutsche Reichstag 1938, IV. Wahlperiode, R. v. Decker's Verlag, G. Schenck, Berlin 1938

External links
Philipp Würzbacher in the database of members of the Reichstag

1898 births
1984 deaths
Members of the Reichstag of Nazi Germany
Sturmabteilung personnel
20th-century Freikorps personnel
Organisation Consul members